Donald Green (born 1961) is an American political scientist.

Donald Green may also refer to:

Donald Green (cricketer) (born 1933), Australian cricketer
Don Green (coach) (1920–1995), American track and field coach
Don Green (footballer) (1924–1996), English footballer